María Fernanda Contreras Muñoz (born 11 August 1998), commonly known as Mafer Contreras, is a Guatemalan footballer who plays as a midfielder for Haukar and the Guatemalan national team.

Early life and college 

Contreras was born in Guatemala City to Erick Contreras and Patricia Muñoz. She later moved to the United States to attend and play soccer at Montverde Academy.  In 2017, she enrolled at The Citadel and later captained The Citadel Bulldogs women's soccer team.

Club career 

In March 2022, Contreras signed with Icelandic team Haukar.

References

1998 births
Living people
Sportspeople from Guatemala City
Women's association football midfielders
Guatemalan women's footballers
Guatemala women's international footballers
The Citadel Bulldogs women's soccer players
Guatemalan expatriate footballers
Expatriate women's footballers in Iceland